Zubillaga is a village in Lantarón municipality, Álava, Basque Country, Spain.

Populated places in Álava